Doghouse Grove is a  nature reserve in Wilburton in Cambridgeshire. It is managed by the Wildlife Trust for Bedfordshire, Cambridgeshire and Northamptonshire.

In the medieval period this was a series of monastic fishponds, which can still be seen in wetter periods. It is now an ash wood, with flowers including bluebells and lords-and-ladies.

There is access by a permissive footpath from Twenty Pence Road.

References

Wildlife Trust for Bedfordshire, Cambridgeshire and Northamptonshire reserves